Uganda competed at the 1980 Summer Olympics in Moscow, USSR.  The nation returned to the Olympic Games after boycotting the 1976 Summer Olympics.

Medalists

Silver
 John Mugabi — Boxing, Men's Welterweight

Athletics

Men
Track & road events

Field events

Boxing

Men

References
Official Olympic Reports
International Olympic Committee results database
sports-reference

Nations at the 1980 Summer Olympics
1980
1980 in Ugandan sport